The Capp-Pierce Juggernaut is an American big band jazz ensemble, named after the 1977 album Juggernaut (Concord Jazz) by Frank Capp and Nat Pierce.

The group was known equivalently as the Capp-Pierce Orchestra and the Capp-Pierce Juggernaut in its early years. Its membership was rotating, though Capp and Pierce remained its leaders until Pierce's death in 1992, after which Capp continued with the group as "The Frank Capp Juggernaut".

Members

Frank Capp
Nat Pierce
Bill Berry
Blue Mitchell
Snooky Young
Conte Candoli
Frank Szabo
Benny Powell
Britt Woodman
Buster Cooper
Garnett Brown
Marshal Royal
Lanny Morgan
Joe Romano
Richie Kamuca
Plas Johnson
Rickey Woodard
Pete Christlieb
Bob Cooper
Red Holloway
Jack Nimitz
Gerry Wiggins
Herb Ellis
Dennis Budimir
John Pisano
Chuck Berghofer
Ernie Andrews
Jackie Kelso
Joe Roccisano
Mel Wanzo
Bill Green

Discography
Frank Capp & Nat Pierce: Juggernaut (Concord Jazz CJ-40, 1976)
The Capp-Pierce Juggernaut: Live at the Century Plaza with Joe Williams (Concord Jazz CJ-72, 1978)
The Frank Capp-Nat Pierce Orchestra: Juggernaut Strikes Again! with Ernie Andrews (Concord Jazz 4183, 1982)
The Capp-Pierce Juggernaut: Live at the Alley Cat with Ernestine Anderson (Concord Jazz 4336, 1987)

The Frank Capp Juggernaut
In A Hefti Bag (Compositions & Arrangements By Neal Hefti) (Concord Jazz, 1995)Play It Again Sam'' (Concord Jazz, 1997)

References

American jazz ensembles
Big bands
Musical groups from Los Angeles
Jazz musicians from California